Rasheed Oladimeji Alabi Suaibu (born 9 January 1986 in Kaduna) is a Nigerian footballer who last played for Iranian club Sanat Naft.

Career
He also played for OFI Crete and Doxa Katokopias. He scored his first goal for AC Omonia in the UEFA Cup against Manchester City.

Honours
AC Omonia
Cypriot Championship: 2010
Cypriot Cup: 2011, 2012
Cyprus FA Shield: 2010, 2012

Notes

1986 births
Living people
Nigerian footballers
Nigeria international footballers
Association football defenders
Cypriot First Division players
Liga Portugal 2 players
Persian Gulf Pro League players
Doxa Katokopias FC players
AC Omonia players
Leixões S.C. players
Pafos FC players
Sanat Naft Abadan F.C. players
University of Nigeria alumni
Nigerian expatriate footballers
Nigerian expatriate sportspeople in Cyprus
Nigerian expatriate sportspeople in Portugal
Nigerian expatriate sportspeople in Iran
Expatriate footballers in Cyprus
Expatriate footballers in Portugal
Expatriate footballers in Iran
Yoruba sportspeople
Sportspeople from Kaduna